Dagny is a commune in France.

Dagny may also refer to:

 Dagny (name), female first name
 Dagny (film), Norwegian-Polish film
 Dagny-Lambercy, commune in France
 Dagny Johnson Key Largo Hammock Botanical State Park, Florida
 SS Dagny, a ship
 Dagny (song), a 1958 Owe Thörnqvist song
 Dagny, a Swedish women's magazine
 Dagny (singer), a Norwegian pop singer